Rosemary Clooney Sings the Lyrics of Ira Gershwin is a 1979 album by Rosemary Clooney, of songs with lyrics by Ira Gershwin.

Track listing
 "But Not for Me" – 5:47
 "Nice Work If You Can Get It" – 2:58
 "How Long Has This Been Going On?" – 4:58
 "Fascinating Rhythm" – 2:56
 "Love Is Here to Stay" – 3:48
 "Strike Up the Band" – 3:46
 "Long Ago (and Far Away)" (Jerome Kern) – 4:24
 "They All Laughed" – 4:05
 "The Man that Got Away" (Harold Arlen) – 6:00
 "They Can't Take That Away from Me" – 3:29

All lyrics by Ira Gershwin, all music by George Gershwin, other composers noted.

Personnel
 Rosemary Clooney - vocal
 Scott Hamilton - tenor saxophone
 Warren Vaché - cornet, flugelhorn
 Roger Glenn - flute
 Cal Collins - guitar
 Nat Pierce - piano
 Chris Amberger - double bass
 Jeff Hamilton - drums

References 

1979 albums
Concord Records albums
George and Ira Gershwin tribute albums
Rosemary Clooney albums